Sea grape or seagrape may refer to:

Plants and algae
 Coccoloba uvifera, a flowering plant native to Tropical America, including Florida, the Caribbean and nearby islands
 Seaweeds in the genus Caulerpa, especially:
 C. lentillifera, eaten in Southeast Asia
 C. racemosa 
 Ephedra distachya, a shrub that grows in southern Europe and parts of western and central Asia
 Halosaccion glandiforme, another seaweed unrelated to Caulerpa.

Animals
 Molgula manhattensis, a species of tunicate, or more generally any member of the genus Molgula
 The eggs of cuttlefish